Nicholas Andres Martinez (born August 5, 1990) is an American professional baseball pitcher for the San Diego Padres of Major League Baseball (MLB). He has previously played in MLB for the Texas Rangers and San Diego Padres, and for the Hokkaido Nippon-Ham Fighters and Fukuoka SoftBank Hawks of Nippon Professional Baseball (NPB).

Amateur career
Martinez graduated from Belen Jesuit Preparatory School in Miami, Florida, and enrolled at Fordham University. He is the 34th Fordham alumnus to make it to the Major League Baseball (MLB). He was 1-3 with a 5.33 ERA in 15 games, over two seasons for Fordham as a relief pitcher. He was mostly a second baseman, batting .295 with 4 HR, 66 RBI, 167 hits, and 22 stolen bases over three seasons and 148 games. In 2011, he played collegiate summer baseball with the Falmouth Commodores of the Cape Cod Baseball League. He also played in the New England Collegiate Baseball League for the Vermont Mountaineers. He is the seventh Mountaineer to make it to the MLB.

Professional career

Texas Rangers
Martinez was drafted by the Texas Rangers in the 18th round of the 2011 Major League Baseball draft, out of Fordham University. He made his professional debut with the AZL Rangers, and also appeared for the Low-A Spokane Indians, posting a cumulative 2.75 ERA across 10 contests. The next year, Martinez played for the Single-A Hickory Crawdads, pitching to a 8-6 record and 4.83 ERA across 31 appearances. Martinez split the 2013 season between the High-A Myrtle Beach Pelicans and the Double-A Frisco RoughRiders, logging a 12-7 record and 2.50 ERA with 128 strikeouts in 151.1 innings of work.

Martinez was named the Rangers' fifth starter on March 26, 2014. He was formally selected to the 40-man roster on April 5 and promoted to the major leagues for the first time. In his first career start against the Tampa Bay Rays, Martinez went six innings, struck out three and allowed three earned runs on four hits. He received a no decision as the Rangers lost 5–4. After two straight starts against the Oakland Athletics, the Rangers got Matt Harrison back from the DL and moved Martinez to the bullpen. Martinez went 6.2 innings, struck out six and allowed only one earned run in four relief appearances. In a game against the Houston Astros, Harrison injured his lower back and had spinal fusion surgery. The Rangers then put Martinez back into the starting rotation. Martinez finished his rookie season with a 5-12 record and 4.55 ERA in 29 major league contests. In 2015, Martinez posted an ERA of 3.96 and shared the major league lead in hit batsmen, with 13. In 2016, Martinez split the year between the Triple-A Round Rock Express and Texas, recording a 2-3 record and 5.59 ERA in 12 big league games. In 2017, Martinez pitched to a 3-8 record and 5.66 ERA with 67 strikeouts in 111.1 innings of work for Texas.

Hokkaido Nippon-Ham Fighters

Upon reaching free agency and limited interest from MLB teams, Martinez signed a one-year, $1.8 million contract with the Hokkaido Nippon-Ham Fighters of Nippon Professional Baseball (NPB) on January 6, 2018. According to reports, the contract included possible incentives based on innings pitched. In his first NPB season, Martinez went 10-11 with 93 strikeouts and an ERA of 3.51. On December 18, 2018, Martinez re-signed with the team on a one-year, $2.2 million contract. In 2019, Martinez pitched four innings. On October 18, 2019, Martinez signed a 1-year extension to remain with the Fighters. In 2020, Martinez made 17 appearances for the Fighters, logging a 2-7 record and 4.62 ERA. On December 2, 2020, he became a free agent.

Fukuoka SoftBank Hawks
On January 30, 2021, Martinez signed with the Fukuoka SoftBank Hawks of Nippon Professional Baseball.

San Diego Padres
On March 19, 2022, Martinez signed a major league contract with the San Diego Padres. At the end of the 2022 offseason, Martinez opted out of his contract. On November 22, 2022, Martinez signed a three-year, $26 million contract with the Padres.

International career
On July 2, 2021, Martinez was named to the roster for the United States national baseball team for the 2020 Summer Olympics, contested in 2021 in Tokyo. The team went on to win silver, losing to hosts Japan in the gold medal game.

References

External links

 NPB.jp
 37 Nikku maruteinesu PLAYERS2021 - Fukuoka SoftBank Hawks Official site
 

1990 births
Living people
American expatriate baseball players in the Dominican Republic
American expatriate baseball players in Japan
American sportspeople of Cuban descent
Arizona League Rangers players
Baseball players at the 2020 Summer Olympics
Baseball players from Miami
Falmouth Commodores players
Fordham Rams baseball players
Frisco RoughRiders players
Fukuoka SoftBank Hawks players
Hickory Crawdads players
Hokkaido Nippon-Ham Fighters players
Major League Baseball pitchers
Medalists at the 2020 Summer Olympics
Myrtle Beach Pelicans players
Nippon Professional Baseball pitchers
Olympic baseball players of the United States
Olympic silver medalists for the United States in baseball
San Diego Padres players
Spokane Indians players
Round Rock Express players
Texas Rangers players
Toros del Este players
United States national baseball team players
2023 World Baseball Classic players